Seagull Book, formerly called Seagull Book & Tape, is an American retail chain bookstore focusing on products for members of the Church of Jesus Christ of Latter-day Saints (LDS Church), with over two dozen stores in Utah, Idaho, Arizona, and Nevada.  It was the second largest LDS bookstore until being acquired in 2006 by market-leader Deseret Book, and since then Seagull has continued to operate as a discount chain, distinct from Deseret Book branded retail stores.

History

Founding 
Seagull Book & Tape was founded in 1987 by V. Lewis Kofford, the owner of LDS publisher Covenant Communications.  He had organized Covenant in 1984, which absorbed Covenant Recordings, an LDS audio tape producer which Kofford had owned since 1977.  He intended Seagull to be a distribution channel for Covenant and other independent LDS publishers, and to fill a discount retail niche in the LDS market, by keeping low overhead and purchasing in volume.  Headquartered in American Fork, Utah, the bookstore was initially a division of Covenant Communications, and later its "sister company".

Seagull sold books, audio tapes, CDs, videos, and computer software.  Some of its locations even bought and sold used and rare LDS books.  In addition, the chain also sold traditional titles, such as self-improvement, fiction, children's books, cartoons and videos.

Though Deseret Book was the largest LDS retailer, it was also the largest LDS publisher, and so from its beginning Seagull sold Deseret Book products as a significant portion of its offerings.  In the early 1990s LDS retailers, including Deseret Book, were rapidly expanding and the market had doubled since the 1970s.  Seagull grew aggressively in its first few years and kept comparable offerings to Deseret Book.

The company was a Kofford family business.  From 1990 to 1992, Lewis brought in his son Greg Kofford, an MIT graduate and Wall Street investor, as Seagull's president and CEO.  Afterward, Lewis Kofford himself served as president and CEO. Along with his daughter Kim Kofford served as Vice President, Merchandise and Marketing from 1997-2002. Then in the 2000s, Jon Kofford was vice president of Marketing and executive vice president.

Growth

Seagull Book's first store was a  retail space on Redwood Road in Salt Lake City.  By 1990 it had grown to 8 locations.  After expanding to 12 stores in 1991, including into California and Texas, revenue increased dramatically, leading to plans for further expansion.  By 1992 the company had nearly $4 million in annual sales, 35 employees, and 15 locations.

During the 1990s Seagull had a cooperative advertising program with independent publisher Bookcraft, but when Deseret Book bought out Bookcraft in 1999 Seagull began to worry that Deseret Book would give preferential treatment to its own retail stores.  In that same year Seagull launched SeagullBook.com as an online bookstore.

During the 2000s Seagull continued "chipping away" at Deseret Book as its main competitor.  By 2006, it operated 26 stores with between 200 and 300 employees.

Deseret Book conflict
In July 2006, Deseret Book publicly disputed how its products were promoted at Seagull bookstores.  Deseret Book claimed Seagull wasn't properly honoring its merchandising programs or adequately utilizing promotional materials, which it requires of all its vendors.  Deseret Book announced that its wholesale division would no longer sell to Seagull Book and it was not seeking negotiation before the decision would take effect at the end of the month.

This announcement was "a complete surprise to Seagull management" who saw this as "a deliberate attack on its presence in the LDS market" and assumed "discount prices are the reason."  Some worried this could crush Seagull's business, which was understood to rely on sales from Deseret Book products.

Attempting to negotiate their situation, Seagull Book consulted with a public relations company and scheduled a press conference.  Within hours the conference was canceled when Deseret Book lifted their ban for one month to allow for talks with Seagull.  As the companies explored the possibility of Deseret Book acquiring Seagull, the deadline was extended beyond August.

Acquisition
In December 2006, Deseret Book bought Seagull Book, as well as its sister company, Covenant Communications, another major Deseret Book competitor.  Financial details were not publicly disclosed.

At the age of 67, Lewis Kofford was considering retirement and initiated the buyout discussions.  In recent years Deseret Book had acquired other major competitors, including Bookcraft, Excel Entertainment Group, and LDS Living magazine.

This created a chain of 69 stores, although they would continue as two independent, coexisting companies, and retain their existing stores, employees, and market specialties.  The retailers were already successfully filling two different niches in the LDS market, and rather than transform into Deseret Book, Seagull would act as its discount chain.  Seagull Book has continued to operate as an independent entity to Deseret Book retail stores.

Following the merger, independent publisher Kent Larsen published his concerns, saying that when Deseret Book has previously acquired its largest competitors (such as Bookcraft in 1999), the LDS market shrank resulting in fewer publications and leading to downsizing.

Company name

The "Tape" in Seagull Book & Tape referred to the store's marketing of audio cassette tapes, generally of recorded sermons and lectures of popular LDS speakers.  Many of these products were produced by Covenant Recordings, or Covenant Communications, for which owner Lewis Kofford also founded Seagull as a retail outlet.  When Seagull was sold to Deseret Book in 2006, the store's name was shortened to "Seagull Book".  By this time audio tape products had been largely replaced by Compact Discs (CDs).

The seagull is a symbol in Mormon culture from the miracle of the gulls, where early pioneers were saved from a plague of crickets.  The bird is also honored as the Utah state bird and in the LDS Church's Seagull Monument in Salt Lake City.

Notes

External links
 Seagull Book website
 Deseret Book corporate profile from Deseret Management Corporation, the parent company
 Interviews on Mormon Stories in 2007 with Kent Larsen and Christopher Bigelow about the Seagull/Covenant acquisition

1987 establishments in Utah
Bookstores of the United States
Companies based in Salt Lake City
Deseret Management Corporation
Retail companies disestablished in 2006
Retail companies established in 1987
Mormon literature